, also known as , is a trans-Neptunian object that orbits in the outer Solar System beyond the orbit of Neptune. This identification was confirmed and announced by the Minor Planet Center in January 2021.

Once thought to be a centaur crossing the orbits of the gas giants,  is now known to be a trans-Neptunian object in a 3:5 orbital resonance with Neptune.

Observations

First observation and loss 

 was near perihelion 35.4 AU from the Sun when it was first observed in 1995, by astronomers Nichole Danzl and Arianna Gleason of the Spacewatch survey at Kitt Peak Observatory in Arizona, United States. It was only observed 14 times over 36 days, from 20 September to 26 October 1995.

Recovery 

On 30 November 2020, amateur astronomers S. Deen and K. Ly identified  as the 3:5 resonant trans-Neptunian object , which was discovered by Pan-STARRS 1 in 2010. The identification was published by the Minor Planet Center on 27 January 2021.

Classification and orbit 
 orbits the Sun at an average distance of 42.33 AU once every 275 years. Its orbit has an eccentricity of 0.16 and an inclination of 4° with respect to the ecliptic plane. Over the course of its orbit, its distance from the Sun ranges from 35.4 AU at perihelion to 49.3 AU at aphelion.  is in a 3:5 mean-motion orbital resonance with Neptune; for every three orbits it makes, Neptune orbits five times.

Numbering and naming 

 was numbered by the Minor Planet Center on 25 September 2018 and received the number  in the minor planet catalog. The alternate provisional designation  was given by the Minor Planet Center on 27 January 2021 after the two objects were linked. , it has not been named.

See also 
 Lost minor planet
 1995 GJ – lost trans-Neptunian object
  – misidentified nonexistent minor planet
  – main-belt asteroid originally misidentified as a trans-Neptunian object

References

External links 
 A 300-kilometre space rock has vanished since we saw it in 1995, Joshua Sokol, New Scientist, 25 October 2017
 

523731
523731
523731
19950920
20101008